The men's lightweight (60 kg/132 lbs) Low-Kick category at the W.A.K.O. World Championships 2007 in Belgrade was the fourth lightest of the male Low-Kick tournaments involving thirteen fighters from three continents (Europe, Asia and Africa).  Each of the matches was three rounds of two minutes each and were fought under Low-Kick rules.

As there were not enough fighters for a sixteen-man tournament, three of the competitors had byes through to the quarter finals.  The tournament winner was Russian Zurab Faroyan who defeated multiple time world champion Eduard Mammadov from Azerbaijan by split decision in the gold medal match.  Belarusian Dzianis Tselitsa and Turk Fikri Arican won bronze medals.

Results

Key

See also
List of WAKO Amateur World Championships
List of WAKO Amateur European Championships
List of male kickboxers

References

External links
 WAKO World Association of Kickboxing Organizations Official Site

Kickboxing events at the WAKO World Championships 2007 Belgrade
2007 in kickboxing
Kickboxing in Serbia